Ryan Chapman (born 14 April 1987 in Cape Town, Western Cape) is a South African football (soccer) striker for Royal Eagles.

References

External links
Ryan Chapman at Soccerway

1987 births
Living people
Sportspeople from Cape Town
Association football forwards
South African soccer players
Cape Coloureds
Santos F.C. (South Africa) players
Bidvest Wits F.C. players
SuperSport United F.C. players
Lamontville Golden Arrows F.C. players
University of Pretoria F.C. players
Stellenbosch F.C. players
Royal Eagles F.C. players
South Africa A' international soccer players
2014 African Nations Championship players